Zovashen (formerly, Dallaklu) is a village in the Kotayk Province of Armenia. The village is overwhelmingly ethnic Armenian (86%) while the remaining population is Kurdish (14%) and the locals are mainly engaged in agriculture.

See also 
Kotayk Province

References 

Populated places in Kotayk Province
Kurdish settlements in Armenia